Callambulyx schintlmeisteri is a species of moth of the  family Sphingidae. It is known from Vietnam.

References

Callambulyx
Moths described in 1997